Diane-class submarine may refer to one of the following classes of submarine for the French Navy:

  in service 1916–1935
  in service 1931–1946